Eric Eugene Crouch (born November 16, 1978) is a former American football quarterback. He also is a TV sports analyst and recreational equipment vendor.

Crouch played college football for the University of Nebraska. In 2001 Crouch won the Heisman Trophy, awarded annually to the most outstanding collegiate football player in the United States. He also won the Davey O'Brien National Quarterback Award, given annually to the best collegiate quarterback in the US. During that year running Nebraska's option offense, he completed 105 of 189 passes for 1,510 yards and seven touchdowns, while also rushing for 1,115 yards and 18 touchdowns. Crouch was the USA Today Nebraska Player of the Year, and a Parade All-American athlete at Millard North High School, where he was a two-time All-State selection at quarterback. Crouch appeared on the cover of the video game NCAA College Football 2K3.

High School 
Crouch attended Millard North High School in Omaha, Nebraska graduating in 1997. As a senior, Crouch ran for 1,277 yards and 15 touchdowns adding 543 passing yards and 5 touchdowns. Crouch was named Gatorade High School Player of the Year for the state of Nebraska. He finished is high school career with 5,134 yards of total offense. 

Crouch also ran Track & Field focusing on the sprints. He placed 2nd and 4th in the State Championships in the 100 meter and 200 meter races, respectively. His 10.4 second 100 meter mark, ranks him tied for 5th all time in Nebraska.

College football
Ankle surgery forced Crouch to redshirt for the 1997 co-national championship-winning season. In 1998, Bobby Newcombe began the season as the starting quarterback, but he was sidelined by a knee injury after the first game and Crouch took over the starting duties. Against UAB, Crouch rushed for two touchdowns and completed 11 of 17 passes in his first career start. 1998 proved to be a chaotic season for the Cornhuskers. Crouch made another start before being replaced by a healthy Bobby Newcombe. Newcombe started the next five games, but was pulled in the middle of a game because of a PCL strain. Senior walk-on, Monte Christo, took over for Newcombe, and started the following week against Texas. With Texas leading 10-0 in the middle of the second quarter, Christo was pulled and replaced by Crouch. Crouch remained the starter for the rest of the season, which ended with a 23-20 loss to Arizona in the Holiday Bowl.

The next fall Newcombe was named the starting quarterback, and it was rumored that Crouch might leave the team. Crouch, however, was given significant playing time in the first and second games. He started the third game against Southern Mississippi, and Newcombe moved to wingback. Crouch led Nebraska in a season that saw NU avenge its only loss of the season in a rematch against Texas in the Big 12 Championship Game. The Cornhuskers finished the season with a 12-1 record and ranked No. 3 after defeating Tennessee in the Fiesta Bowl.

Crouch started every game in the 2000 season, which ended with a 66-17 trouncing of Northwestern in the Alamo Bowl. Nebraska's only losses during the 10-2 season were to eventual national champion, Oklahoma Sooners, and the Kansas State Wildcats.

In 2001 Crouch had his best year, breaking school or NCAA records almost weekly and appearing to be a serious contender for the Heisman Trophy. In the first game of the 2001 season, a 21-7 defeat of TCU, Crouch surpassed Tommie Frazier as Nebraska's all-time total offense leader. He became the Big 12 all-time career rushing quarterback in the emotionally charged game against Rice. The next week, against Missouri, Crouch was backed up near the goal line when he scrambled to escape from defenders and pulled off a 95-yard touchdown run, the longest in school history. Against Iowa State the following week, Crouch broke the record for career touchdowns by a quarterback. Crouch became only the fourth player in Division 1 history to both pass and rush for 3,000 yards in a career with his performance against Texas Tech. Next, in a hard-fought game against defending national champion Oklahoma, Crouch again showed off his speed and playmaking abilities, this time serving as quarterback and receiver in a single play, the famous "Black 41 Flash Reverse Pass" in which Crouch made a 63-yard touchdown reception. By mid-November Crouch had set a school record for most career wins as a starter and became only the ninth quarterback in D-1A history to have won 35 games as a starter. The Cornhuskers were 11-0 going into the annual contest with Colorado the day after Thanksgiving. Crouch had a career day, setting the school record for offense yards in a single game with 360 yards. The Nebraska defense was dominated by the Buffaloes, however, and gave up a then-record 62 points to Colorado. The 62-36 loss appeared to have ended Nebraska's hopes of playing for the national championship and to have hurt Crouch's chances of winning the Heisman. Two weeks later, Crouch was announced as the recipient of the award, edging out Florida's Rex Grossman and Miami's Ken Dorsey in the closest Heisman ballot since 1985. His outstanding season also was recognized when he won the Davey O'Brien Award for being the best collegiate quarterback in the nation during the 2001 season. In the meantime several highly ranked teams were upset and in the final BCS rankings, Nebraska beat out one-loss Oregon and two-loss Colorado to earn the No. 2 spot in the BCS rankings. The final BCS rankings were steeped in controversy since Nebraska had the chance to play in the Rose Bowl for the national championship despite not winning a conference or division championship. In the Rose Bowl on January 3, 2002, Crouch rushed for 114 yards against the Miami Hurricanes but was denied a touchdown for the first time since September, 1999. The No. 1 Hurricanes defeated the Cornhuskers 37-14, leaving Crouch with a 35-7 record as a starting quarterback.

Awards
 2001 Heisman Trophy
 2001 Davey O'Brien Award
 2001 Walter Camp Award
 2001 Big 12 Conference offensive player of the year
 2000 Third-Team All-American (College Football News)
 2000 Second-Team All-Big 12 (AP, Sporting News, Dallas Morning News, Houston Chronicle)
 2000 Third-Team All-Big 12 (Coaches)
 2000 Fiesta Bowl Offensive MVP vs. Tennessee
 1999 Big 12 Co-Offensive Player of the Year (Coaches)

Records
 One of three quarterbacks in Division I-A history to rush for 3,000 and pass for 4,000 yards in a career
 13th player in NCAA to rush and pass for 1,000 in a season (1,115 rushing, 1,510 passing)
 Nebraska career total offense leader with 7,915 yards
 Former Nebraska single-season total offense leader with 2,688 yards
 Former Nebraska single-game total offense record of 360 yards
 Nebraska career total-offense touchdown leader with 88
 Owns Nebraska career record for most rushing yards by a quarterback (3,434)
 NCAA record for most career rushing touchdowns by a quarterback (59)
 Most rushing attempts by a Husker quarterback (648)
 Former Nebraska total TD passes in a game (5 vs. Iowa)
 Most rushing TDs in a game by a quarterback (4 vs. Kansas)
 Set a QB record for most rushing TDs in a season (20)
 Set school records in 2001 for most rushing attempts in a season for a quarterback (203)
 Most total offense yards by a sophomore (2,158)
 Tied an NCAA record by scoring a TD via run, pass, reception in the same game (vs. University of California, Berkeley, 1999)
 Nebraska school record longest run from scrimmage, 95 yards (vs. Missouri, 2001)

Statistics

Professional football

NFL and NFL Europe 
Crouch was initially drafted by the St. Louis Rams of the NFL as a wide receiver, but still wanted to play quarterback. Crouch, however, was seen by NFL teams as being too short to play quarterback. His athleticism was seen as better suited for playing wideout, but a hard tackle by a defensive player caused him to have 150cc of blood drained from his leg. Because of the injury, Crouch left the team before playing a game. 

Crouch signed with the Kansas City Chiefs in January 2005, and was allocated to the Hamburg Sea Devils of NFL Europe. Crouch converted to the safety position, recording 25 tackles and 2 passes defended.

CFL
Crouch's opportunity to play quarterback at the professional level finally came when he signed with the Toronto Argonauts of the Canadian Football League on February 15, 2006 as a quarterback. (The Argonauts had owned his CFL rights for several years.) In his inaugural CFL season Crouch eventually became the fourth-string quarterback in Toronto, behind Damon Allen, Michael Bishop, and Spergon Wynn. On July 22, 2006, Crouch made his regular season CFL debut against the Saskatchewan Roughriders in Regina, Saskatchewan. Coming in at the start of the second half following an injury to Wynn, Crouch sealed the win for Toronto with solid play, including a 94-yard pass completion to Arland Bruce III.

In 2007 Crouch was expected to battle Michael Bishop, Damon Allen, Mike McMahon and Tom Arth for the Argos' starting quarterback position, but he eventually faltered because of injury. He began the season on the nine-week disabled list.  After coming off the disabled list, Crouch was released by the Argonauts on September 6, 2007.

AAFL
On September 25, 2007, Crouch signed with the upstart All-American Football League. He was drafted 3rd overall by Team Texas on January 26, 2008, in the first round of the league's inaugural draft. He was, however, released from his contract (along with all AAFL players) when the league canceled its debut season.

UFL
On April 9, 2011, Crouch attended a public workout for the United Football League's Omaha Nighthawks.  On June 8, 2011, Crouch accepted an invitation to attend the Nighthawks mini-camp. On June 10, 2011, he was added to the Nighthawks official roster.  The UFL suspended operations on October 20, 2012.

Post-playing career
Eric Crouch was a sales territory manager for a major medical device manufacturer in the US. Currently, Crouch is a vendor of playground and recreation equipment at Crouch Recreation in Omaha, Nebraska.

He has been a TV studio analyst for KETV Channel 7 in Omaha, and a studio analyst on Versus. Crouch joined Fox College Football as an In-Game Analyst for FX in 2013.

Crouch is the current running backs and special teams coach at Midland University in Fremont, Nebraska.

See also
 List of Division I FBS rushing touchdown leaders

References

External links
 Nebraska profile
 
 
 
 Just Sports Stats

1978 births
Living people
American football quarterbacks
American football safeties
American players of Canadian football
Canadian football quarterbacks
College football announcers
Hamburg Sea Devils players
Nebraska Cornhuskers football players
Omaha Nighthawks players
Toronto Argonauts players
College Football Hall of Fame inductees
Heisman Trophy winners
Sportspeople from Omaha, Nebraska
Players of American football from Nebraska
American expatriate sportspeople in Canada
American expatriate sportspeople in Germany